Canine cataracts are a prevalent cause of visual loss in dogs, frequently resulting in blindness. Cataracts typically occur when proteins break down in the lens of a dog's eye and clump together, obstructing the passage of light. There are several reasons cataracts may occur in dogs, such as heredity, trauma, aging, diabetes, glaucoma, and progressive retinal atrophy.

References

Canines